Sovjak is a small settlement in the Municipality of Trnovska Vas in northeastern Slovenia. It lies in the hills just west of Biš. The area is part of the traditional region of Styria. It is now included in the Drava Statistical Region.

References

External links
Sovjak at Geopedia

Populated places in the Municipality of Trnovska vas